Zoltán Kammerer (born 10 March 1978) is a Hungarian sprint canoeist who has competed since the mid-1990s. Competing in five Summer Olympics, he won three gold medals (K-2 500 m: 2000, K-4 1000 m: 2000, 2004) and a silver medal (K-4 1000 m: 2012).

Kammerer also twelve medals at the ICF Canoe Sprint World Championships with three golds (K-2 1000 m: 2006, K-4 500 m: 1997, K-4 1000 m: 1999), four silvers (K-2 500 m: 2009, K-2 1000 m: 2010, K-4 1000 m: 2001, 2003), and five bronzes (K-2 500 m: 2002, 2006, 2007; K-2 1000 m: 2007, K-4 500 m: 1999).

A member of the Győr club, he is 182 cm (6'0) tall and weighs 86 kg (190 lbs).

At the 2008 Summer Olympics, Kammerer carried the Hungarian flag at the opening ceremonies. This was initially planned to be given to his fellow canoeist György Kolonics who had died a month before the Games.

In June 2015, he competed in the inaugural European Games, for Hungary in canoe sprint, more specifically, Men's K-2 1000m with Tamas Szalai and K-4 1000m with Dávid Tóth, Tamás Kulifai, and Dániel Pauman. He earned gold medals in both areas.

Awards
 Masterly youth athlete: 1995
 Hungarian kayaker of the Year (3): 2000, 2006, 2010
 Honorary Citizen of Göd (2003)
 Honorary Citizen of Győr (2004)

Orders and special awards
  Order of Merit of the Republic of Hungary – Officer's Cross (2000)
   Order of Merit of the Republic of Hungary – Commander's Cross (2004)
   Order of Merit of Hungary – Commander's Cross with Star (2012)

References

External links
 Canoe09.ca profile
 Kataca.hu profile 
 Photo 1 of Kammerer
 Photo 2 of Kammerer
 
 

1978 births
Living people
Hungarian male canoeists
Olympic canoeists of Hungary
Canoeists at the 1996 Summer Olympics
Canoeists at the 2000 Summer Olympics
Canoeists at the 2004 Summer Olympics
Canoeists at the 2008 Summer Olympics
Canoeists at the 2012 Summer Olympics
Medalists at the 2000 Summer Olympics
Medalists at the 2004 Summer Olympics
Medalists at the 2012 Summer Olympics
Olympic gold medalists for Hungary
Olympic silver medalists for Hungary
Olympic medalists in canoeing
ICF Canoe Sprint World Championships medalists in kayak
European Games medalists in canoeing
European Games gold medalists for Hungary
Canoeists at the 2015 European Games
Canoeists at the 2019 European Games
People from Vác
Sportspeople from Pest County
21st-century Hungarian people